"Because I Love You" is a song by Australian recording artist Montaigne. The song was released in June 2016 as the third and final single from Montaigne's debut studio album, Glorious Heights. The song peaked at number 98 on the ARIA Charts; becoming Montaigne's first charting album. The song was certified platinum in Australia in 2021.

Montaigne told The Music AU her motives for the song was "a look back at what you'd known to be a healthy and fulfilling relationship whilst experiencing it, but with a little perspective discovered was pretty bad. I wrote this song and only after writing it did I realize that that's how I felt the whole time." adding "It's a classic “love is blind” narrative. I love this song; it's probably the most fun thing I've ever written."  It was featured in episode 8 of the Netflix show Heartstopper.

Reception
In an album review, Dylan Marshall from the AU Review said "'Because I Love You' is just a straight up, pop gem... with its self-reflection on a failed relationship being the focal point of the track, it showcases the lengths people are willing to go to in an attempt to overlook problems one might face with their significant other."

Track listing
Digital download
"Because I Love You" – 3:37

Charts

Certifications

Release history

References

2016 songs
2016 singles
Montaigne (musician) songs
Sony Music Australia singles